Peter John Morgan (born 1 January 1959) is a former Welsh international rugby union player. He played on the wing. In 1980 he toured South Africa with the British Lions and at the time played club rugby for Llanelli RFC.

Playing career
Morgan played rugby from a young age including selection for the Welsh Youth team. After a spell playing with Haverfordwest RFC he switched to first class team Llanelli. In 1979 Morgan was a member of the Llanelli sevens team which won the Snelling Sevens and he was awarded the Everson Award as the player of the tournament. It was as a Llanelli player he was first selected for the Wales national team in the encounter with Scotland during the 1980 Five Nations Championship. In the same year he was chosen to represent the British Lions on their 1980 tour of South Africa. Although he was not selected for any of the Test matches, he played in seven regional encounters, scoring a try in a narrow win over Griqualand West.

Morgan played in four matches for Wales, including the 1980 game against the All Blacks at Cardiff.

Later life

Peter Morgan later became chairman of Pembrokeshire County Council. He suffered an incapacitating stroke in August, 2012.

Notes

1959 births
Living people
British & Irish Lions rugby union players from Wales
Llanelli RFC players
Rugby union centres
Rugby union players from Pembrokeshire
Wales international rugby union players
Welsh rugby union players